"Born to Boogie" is a song written and recorded by American musician Hank Williams Jr.  It was released in June 1987 as the title track and lead single from his album of the same name.  It was a number-one hit in both the United States and Canada.

Charts

Weekly charts

Year-end charts

References

1987 songs
1987 singles
Hank Williams Jr. songs
Songs written by Hank Williams Jr.
Song recordings produced by Barry Beckett
Song recordings produced by Jim Ed Norman
Warner Records singles
Curb Records singles